Muhammad Nawaz Khan may refer to:
 Muhammad Nawaz Khan (politician)
 Muhammad Nawaz Khan (writer) (1943–2015)
 Muhammad Nawaz Khan Kakar